Leyes may refer to:

People
Ángel Leyes (1930–1996), Argentine boxer
Carlos Leyes (born 1950), Argentinian boxer
Damián Leyes (born 1986), Argentine soccer footballer
Gabriel Leyes (born 1990), Uruguayan soccer player
Gregorio Pacheco Leyes (1823–1899), Bolivian businessman
Miguel Ángel Leyes (born 1952), Chilean soccer player
Narciso Campero Leyes (1813–1896), Bolivian general
Nery Leyes (born 1989), Argentinian soccer player

Other uses
 Leyes Priory, Derbyshire, England, UK
 Leyes Wood, Groombridge, East Sussex, England, UK; a listed house

See also

Siete Leyes (7 laws) of California-Texas-Mexico

Leye (disambiguation)
Ley (disambiguation)
Leys (disambiguation)